Spring Creek Reservoir may refer to:

 Spring Creek Reservoir (California)
 Spring Creek Reservoir (Illinois)
 Spring Creek Reservoir (Cascade County, Montana) in Cascade County, Montana
 Spring Creek Reservoir (Missoula County, Montana) in Missoula County, Montana
 Spring Creek Reservoir (New South Wales)